Musteața is a village in Fălești, Moldova.

References

Villages of Fălești District